The CCHA Best Defensive Forward was an annual award given out at the conclusion of the Central Collegiate Hockey Association (CCHA) regular season to the best defensive forward in the conference as voted by the coaches of each CCHA team.

The Best Defensive Forward was first awarded in 1990 and every year thereafter until 2013 when the original CCHA was dissolved as a consequence of the Big Ten Conference forming its men's ice hockey conference.

The CCHA was revived in 2020, with play resuming in the 2021–22 season, by seven schools that left the Western Collegiate Hockey Association, with an eighth school joining before play started. The revived league folded the Best Defensive Forward award into a new CCHA Forward of the Year award.

Award winners

Winners by school

Winners by position

See also
CCHA Awards

References

General

Specific

External links
CCHA awards (incomplete) 

Central Collegiate Hockey Association
College ice hockey trophies and awards in the United States